The Muppet Show is a sketch comedy television series created by Jim Henson and featuring the Muppets. The series originated as two pilot episodes produced by Henson for ABC in 1974 and 1975. While neither episode was moved forward as a series and other networks in the United States rejected Henson's proposals, British producer Lew Grade expressed enthusiasm for the project and agreed to co-produce The Muppet Show for the British channel ATV. Five seasons, totalling 120 episodes, were broadcast on ATV and other ITV franchises in the United Kingdom and in first-run syndication in the United States from 1976 to 1981. The programme was produced and recorded at the ATV Elstree Studios in Borehamwood, Hertfordshire.

The Muppet Show is presented as a variety show, featuring recurring sketches and musical numbers interspersed with plotlines taking place backstage and in other areas of the venue. Within its context, Kermit the Frog (performed by Henson) acts as showrunner and host, who tries to maintain control of the overwhelming antics of the other Muppet characters, as well as appease the rotating slate of guest stars. The Muppet Show is also known for its uniquely designed characters, burlesque nature, slapstick, sometimes absurdist and surreal humour, and parodies. As The Muppet Show became popular, many celebrities were eager to perform with the Muppets on television and in subsequent films.

The cast of performers over the course of the series included Henson, Frank Oz (credited as featured performer as well as creative consultant), Jerry Nelson, Richard Hunt, Dave Goelz, Steve Whitmire, Fran Brill, Eren Özker, Louise Gold, Kathryn Mullen, Karen Prell, Brian Muehl, Bob Payne, John Lovelady, Jane Henson, Peter Friedman, Betsy Baytos, and dancer Graham Fletcher. Many of the performers also worked on Sesame Street, whose characters made sporadic appearances on The Muppet Show. Jack Burns served as the head writer for the first season, before Jerry Juhl became the head writer from the second season. The music was performed by Jack Parnell and his orchestra.

The Muppet Show was produced by ITC Entertainment and Henson Associates. The series was premiered in the UK on 5 September 1976 and ended on 23 May 1981. The rights to the series are currently owned by The Muppets Studio (a division of The Walt Disney Company), having been acquired from The Jim Henson Company on 17 February 2004.

History
Since its debut in 1969, Sesame Street had given Jim Henson's Muppet characters exposure, but he began to perceive that he was becoming typecast as a children's entertainer. Subsequently, he began to conceive a programme for a more adult audience. Two television specials, The Muppets Valentine Show (1974) and The Muppet Show: Sex and Violence (1975), were produced for ABC and are considered pilots for The Muppet Show. Neither of them were ordered to series. However, the prime-time access rule was recently enacted, moving the 7:30 to 8 pm ET slot from the networks to their affiliates. CBS became interested in Henson's series proposals and expressed intent to broadcast it weekly on its owned and operated stations. According to Henson's pitch reel, George Schlatter was originally involved.

Lew Grade, the proprietor of the British commercial station ATV, was familiar with puppet television programmes, having underwritten the various works of Gerry Anderson, while also producing two specials with Henson: Julie on Sesame Street and a special on Herb Alpert & the Tijuana Brass. Grade offered Henson a deal that resulted in the latter's programme being produced at the ATV Elstree Studios. ATV, as part of the ITV network, would broadcast the programme to other ITV stations in the United Kingdom, and its distribution arm, ITC Entertainment, would handle international broadcasts. Henson set aside his misgivings about syndication and accepted.

Meanwhile, Henson's Muppets were featured in The Land of Gorch skits during the first (1975–76) season of the American comedy television programme Saturday Night Live. Although they lasted for only that one season on Saturday Night Live because of conflicts with that show's writers and producers, Henson and his team learned a great deal from being involved with the production. They gained institutional knowledge about adapting and quickly creating a television programme within a seven-day period. Henson also gained valuable friendships with multiple celebrities through his work on Saturday Night Live. Henson and his team were later able to use these skills and relationships on The Muppet Show.

The Muppet Show was first aired in September 1976. By Christmas 1976, the series in the UK saw around 14 million viewers tuning in on Sunday evenings. In January 1977, over 100 countries had either acquired the series or were making offers, which had resulted in over £6 million in overseas sales.

Overview

Opening and closing sequences
"The Muppet Show Theme" (written by Henson and Sam Pottle in 1976) is the show's theme song. While the opening sequence changed from season to season, the overall concept remained the same. Each episode began with "The Muppet Show" logo on a title card. The centre of the "O" then opened to reveal host Kermit the Frog, who announced, "It's The Muppet Show, with our very special guest star, [name of guest star]!" usually cheering afterwards.

During the first season, the theme song contained a joke from Fozzie Bear and featured Kermit introducing the guest star ("To introduce our guest star, that's what I'm here to do, so it really makes me happy to introduce to you..."). At the song's end, Gonzo the Great appeared in front of the "Muppet Show" banner, attempting to play the "O" in "Show" like a gong, with various comical results.

From the second to fourth seasons, the joke and Kermit's introduction were replaced by a short quip from Statler and Waldorf, then a shot of the audience singing "Why don't they get things started?" The fifth season version had an extra verse from the hecklers ("Why do we always come here? I guess we'll never know. It's kind of like a torture to have to watch the show!"). At the end of the song, Gonzo appeared inside the "O" in "Show" to play the final note on a trumpet; again, with various comical results.

Each episode ended with an extended instrumental performance of "The Muppet Show Theme" by the Muppet orchestra before Statler and Waldorf gave the last laugh of the night, followed by Zoot playing an off-key final note on his saxophone. Some last-laugh sequences had other Muppets on the balcony. For example, in one episode, the Muppets of Sesame Street appeared behind Statler and Waldorf, who told them, "How should we know how to get to Sesame Street? We don't even know how to get out of this stupid theatre box!"

Every season, the TV version of the song was presented with re-worked lyrics. While the opening sequence evolved visually over the show's five seasons, the musical composition remained essentially the same. Over the years, the song has become a staple of the Muppets franchise as a whole.

Muppet Theater
The Muppet Theater is the setting for The Muppet Show, a grand old vaudeville house that has seen better days. In episode 106, Kermit identifies the name of the theatre as The Benny Vandergast Memorial Theater, although other episodes merely identify it as "the Muppet Theater". It is also identified as simply "Muppet Theater" in It's a Very Merry Muppet Christmas Movie. It is then that the theatre becomes registered as a historical landmark, and it cannot be shut down. In the film, the theatre is shown to be in New York City.

According to The Phantom of the Muppet Theater, the theatre was built by a stage actor named John Stone in 1802. At some point, a production of Hamlet ran in the theatre, with Stone playing the title role. An alternative exterior is also shown in the book.

Locations seen in the Muppet Theater include backstage right (which includes Kermit's desk), the dressing rooms, the attic (seen in four compilation videos released in 1985), the canteen, the prop room, the stage, Statler and Waldorf's box, the auditorium, reception, the recording studio, the stage door lobby and the back alley. Some of these sets were later re-used as the Happiness Hotel in The Great Muppet Caper. A replica of the theatre is used as the setting for the Muppet*Vision 3D attraction at Disney's Hollywood Studios.

Scooter's uncle J.P. Grosse owns the theatre, and rents it to the Muppets. In a deleted scene from It's a Very Merry Muppet Christmas Movie, Kermit reveals that J.P. has died and left the theatre to the Muppets in his will. This would have taken place some time after 1996, as J.P. can be seen (and referred to as such by the head of the KMUP network) in episode 107 of Muppets Tonight, the 1990s reworking of The Muppet Show.

In the film The Muppets, a badly deteriorated version of the Muppet Theater is located next to Muppet Studios in Los Angeles. The Muppets reunite in hopes of raising enough money to buy the theatre from the oil magnate Tex Richman before he can demolish it and start drilling for oil on the site.

Characters and performers

Many of the characters who appeared on The Muppet Show have appeared in previous and subsequent Muppet productions.

Guest stars
No guest star ever appeared twice on The Muppet Show, although John Denver appeared both on the show and in two specials (John Denver and the Muppets: A Christmas Together and John Denver & the Muppets: Rocky Mountain Holiday), while Dudley Moore reappeared in the special, The Muppets Go to the Movies. Additionally, several guest stars from the series had cameos in the first three Muppet theatrical films, and the season four guest Alan Arkin had a cameo in The Muppets. Originally, the producers had to call on their personal contacts to appeal to them to appear, especially considering that doing so required an overseas trip to Britain. However, the situation changed when the renowned ballet dancer Rudolf Nureyev offered to appear; his performance on this unusual TV programme produced so much favourable publicity that the series became one of the most sought after for various celebrities to appear in.

Many episodes featured actors, such as Steve Martin, Harvey Korman, Sylvester Stallone, Julie Andrews, Carol Burnett, Liza Minnelli, Christopher Reeve, Raquel Welch, Joel Grey and Dom DeLuise; some had veteran performers like Ethel Merman, Bob Hope, Danny Kaye, Don Knotts, Liberace, Peter Ustinov, James Coburn, Lena Horne, Zero Mostel and Vincent Price, and others had well-known pop singers, including Elton John, Diana Ross, Harry Belafonte, Kenny Rogers, Linda Ronstadt, Alice Cooper, Paul Simon, Debbie Harry and Leo Sayer. Sayer's show used his hit song "The Show Must Go On" with slightly changed lyrics in the second verse slightly, from "I wish I could tear down the walls of this theatre" to "I wish I could tear down the walls of this Muppet Theatre". Some guest stars, such as the Monty Python star John Cleese, co-wrote much of their own episodes. The second-to-last episode, in 1981, had the then-James Bond actor Roger Moore, while the final episode to be taped guest-starred the actor and dancer Gene Kelly. Mark Hamill appeared in one episode as both himself and Luke Skywalker, his role in the Star Wars film series. Two of Henson's childhood idols, Edgar Bergen and Milton Berle, also guest-starred during the second season.

In 1977, Rita Moreno won the Primetime Emmy Award for Outstanding Individual Performance in a Variety or Music Program for her appearance. The next year, Peter Sellers — who chose not to appear as himself, instead appearing in a variety of characters — and Bernadette Peters earned nominations for the same award. One episode had the staff writer Chris Langham (who wrote some episodes of this show, starting in the third season) guest-starring when Richard Pryor was unable to make the taping of the episode at the last minute.

An early tradition was to present the guest star with a Muppet likeness of themselves as a parting gift at the end of the show, but this only lasted for the first two episodes produced, with Connie Stevens and Juliet Prowse. The high cost and effort of creating these unique Muppets, scheduling conflicts, and potential legal issues contributed to the decline of this practice, although Muppet caricatures and parodies continued to appear. The practice did, however, take place for actors Michael Caine and Tim Curry, who were the lead performers in The Muppet Christmas Carol and Muppet Treasure Island, respectively.

Recurring sketches

"At the Dance" – The sketch was a regular during the first season but was used less frequently from the second season onward. Muppet characters (some of them being Whatnots) circulated on a semi-formal dance floor offering rapid fire one-liner jokes and come-backs as the couples passed in front of the camera. Debuted in The Muppet Show: Sex and Violence, and played a large role in the plot for a season five episode.
"Bear on Patrol" – Fozzie Bear is a luckless police officer named Patrol Bear and Link Hogthrob is the incompetent chief of police who are always in the silliest situations with the criminals brought in. The voice of the announcer was performed by Jerry Nelson. Debuted in the third season.
"Blackouts" – A bunch of short, comic sketches traditional to vaudeville that end with the lights turning off or a quick closing of the curtain. Only appeared in the first season.
"Cold Openings" – The Cold Openings appeared at the beginning of each episode, and officially introduced the guest star. During the first season, Kermit introduced the guest star during the opening theme. His introduction was followed by a clip of the guest star, usually surrounded by a group of Muppets. Beginning in the second season, the Cold Openings appeared before the opening theme song. Scooter visited the guest star in his/her dressing room, usually saying "Fifteen seconds to curtain". This was then followed by a brief joke. In the fifth season, the guest star entered the Muppet Theatre and was greeted by Pops the Doorman. Pops always said, "Who are you?" as soon as he saw the guest star. After the guest star introduced himself/herself to Pops, a joke would follow.
"An Editorial by Sam the Eagle" – Sam the Eagle gives an editorial on a specific topic which ends up occurring during the editorial. Only appeared in the second season.
"The Electric Mayhem" – A bunch of musical sketches with Dr. Teeth and The Electric Mayhem.
"Fozzie Bear's Act" – Fozzie Bear goes on stage and performs his famously silly jokes. Statler and Waldorf heckle him in a perpetual rivalry. The sketches became less frequent as Fozzie's off-stage presence became more prevalent. In one first-season episode, however, Fozzie, with help from Bruce Forsyth, turned the tables on Statler and Waldorf who waved a white flag in surrender. It mainly appeared during the first season, but made occasional appearances in later seasons.
"Gonzo's Stunts" – These sketches detail the stunts of The Great Gonzo where something would usually go wrong.
"Muppet Labs" – Muppet Labs is "Where the future is being made today!" These segments featured the latest invention from Dr. Bunsen Honeydew with his assistant Beaker having the worst of its inevitable malfunction. During the first season, Honeydew hosted Muppet Labs by himself. The writers soon realised that another character was necessary to show his failings, which resulted in Beaker being introduced in season two.
"Muppet Melodrama" – A sketch where Uncle Deadly captured Miss Piggy and put her in perilous plights to force her to marry him. Wayne would often have to be the one save her. Only appeared in the third season.
"Muppet News Flash" – The Muppet Newsman delivers a news brief about a bizarre incident or human-interest story. During the first season, these segments frequently had an interview with the episode's guest star, who portrayed a person connected to the story. Beginning with the second season, the Muppet Newsman almost invariably suffered some calamity associated with the story, such as being knocked out by a falling light fixture after he reported that the company manufacturing it had dropped production.
"Muppet Sports" – A sports sketch that features different sporting activities that are covered by Louis Kazagger. Debuted in the third season.
"Musical Chickens" – A flock of Muppet chickens pecked the keys of a piano and played a classic song to show off their musical talents.
"Panel Discussions" – A sketch where Kermit the Frog, the guest star and other Muppets discuss various topics. Only appeared in the first season.
"Pigs in Space"  – Parody of science fiction programmes like Star Trek, but also 1930s sci-fi serials. The spacecraft is called USS Swinetrek and the title voice-over is a parody of Lost in Space. It features Captain Link Hogthrob, Dr. Julius Strangepork (the name a take-off on "Dr. Strangelove"), and Miss Piggy as First Mate. Usually, the sketches involved the long-suffering Piggy putting up with the wacko Strangepork and the brain dead Link treating her as an inferior because she is a female (even though she arguably dwarfs them in brainpower). The early sketches usually had odd introductions for all the characters, such as calling Link the "flappable captain", Miss Piggy the "flirtatious first mate", and referring to Dr. Strangepork as "describable". Strangepork usually had the most unusual description of the three during these introductions as he was the oddest member of the group. This portion of the introduction was dropped during season three, and the announcer simply claimed it was "time for...Piiiiiigs...iiiin...spaaaaaaace!" Debuted in the second season.
"Planet Koozebane" – A sketch about a planet containing strange alien lifeforms like the Koozebanian creatures, the Koozebanian Phoob, the Fazoobs, the Koozebanian Spooble, the Four Fazoobs and the Merdlidops. This was a common stop for the Swinetrek crew. The planet also be appeared later in Muppet Babies, the "Space Cowboys" episode of Jim Henson's Little Muppet Monsters and CityKids (which had different Koozebanian aliens). Kermit the Frog later reported from Koozebane in a 1992 Good Morning America appearance. Planet Koozebane was also referred to in the "Science Fiction" episode of The Jim Henson Hour and in the video game Muppets Party Cruise.
"A Poem by Rowlf" – Rowlf the Dog recited a classic poem while other Muppets interrupt him. Only appeared in the first season.
"Rowlf at the Piano" – Rowlf the Dog would sing classical songs and would occasionally be accompanied by the other Muppet characters.
"The Swedish Chef" – A cooking show parody. It consists of the Swedish Chef, who speaks mock Swedish, semi-comprehensible gibberish which parodies the characteristic vowel sounds and intonation of Swedish. He attempts to cook a dish with great enthusiasm until the punchline hits. A hallmark of these sketches was the improvisation between Jim Henson (who performed the Chef's head and voice) and Frank Oz (who was his hands). One would often make something up on the spot, making the other puppeteer comply with the action. Famous gags include "chickie in du baskie" ("two points!"), Swedish meatballs that bounce, and smashing a cake with a baseball bat after it begins insulting the Chef in mock Japanese. Debuted in the pilot "Sex and Violence".
"Talk Spots" – While sitting on a wall, Kermit the Frog talked to the guest star and was occasionally joined by the other Muppets. Mostly appeared during the first season, but made occasional appearances during the second season, and made two appearances in the third season (one of which had Sam the Eagle and the Swedish Chef in place of Kermit).
"Talking Houses" – A bunch of houses that tell jokes to each other. Only appeared during the first season.
"UK Spots" – Due to shorter commercial breaks in the United Kingdom, every episode of The Muppet Show lasted two minutes longer in the UK than in the United States. The extra segments that were filmed to cover this time difference have been referred to as "UK Spots". Most of these consisted of a short song and never featured the guest star.
"Vendaface" – The Vendaface (voiced by Jerry Nelson) is a vending machine that can give any Muppet a facelift. The Vendaface was apparently only meant to be used once, but David Lazer said that they should not build such an expensive puppet only to use it once. The writers then decided to have him on the show a few more times in the first season. The Vendaface later appeared in episode 318 as the Vendawish (voiced by Jerry Nelson) which was a wish-granting machine.
"Veterinarian's Hospital" – Parody of the soap opera General Hospital and other medical dramas, this segment consists of Dr. Bob (played by Rowlf the Dog) cracking corny jokes in the operating room with Nurses Piggy and Janice, much to the bemusement of the frazzled patient. Each instalment ends with Dr. Bob and his nurses looking around in puzzlement as a disembodied narrator tells viewers to "tune in next time, when you'll hear Nurse Piggy / Dr. Bob / Nurse Janice say....", whereupon one of the three 'medics' will prompt a corny response from one of the others. On a number of occasions, the "Veterinarian's Hospital" sketch crossed over with the cast or set of another, such as "At the Dance" or "Pigs in Space". On one occasion, Dr. Bob was the patient while the guest star (Christopher Reeve) played a doctor going to operate on Dr. Bob, and once Nurse Piggy was replaced (much to her chagrin) by guest star Loretta Swit, parodying her Nurse Houlihan character from M*A*S*H. In the first series, the narration was usually performed by John Lovelady, but Jerry Nelson performed the role in both the Harvey Korman and Rita Moreno episodes, before taking over the role permanently from the Phyllis Diller episode. In the introduction, Dr. Bob went from "a former orthopedic surgeon" to "a quack" who has "gone to the dogs".
"Wayne and Wanda" – Each sketch had Wayne and Wanda singing a song, only to be interrupted by some sort of pun relating to a lyric. Sam the Eagle introduced these sketches, as he felt that they were among the few cultured aspects of the show. Only appeared during the first season, although a few new sketches appeared in later seasons with just Wayne.

Episodes

The Muppet Show ran for five seasons, with minor alterations taking place each season.

Soundtracks

The Muppet Show

The Muppet Show - Volume 2

Singles

Awards and nominations

The Muppet Show was nominated for nine BAFTA Awards during its run, winning three. It was nominated for 21 Primetime Emmy Awards, winning four, including the 1978 award for Outstanding Comedy-Variety or Music Series. It was presented with a Peabody Award in 1978. Also in 1978, the show received the Television Award of Merit from the Mary Washington Colonial Chapter of the National Society of the Daughters of the American Revolution.

The series also won the top Variety Prize in the Golden Rose of Montreux international Contest in May 1977.

Primetime Emmy Awards

Others

Home media

Compilation releases
In 1985, Playhouse Video released a collection of video compilations under the Jim Henson's Muppet Video banner. Ten videos were released, featuring original linking material in addition to clips from the show.

Videos included:
 The Muppet Revue (titled Kermit and Fozzie's Favourite Moments in the UK) – Hosted by Kermit and Fozzie as they clean up the attic, with guest stars Linda Ronstadt, Paul Williams, Harry Belafonte, and Rita Moreno
 The Kermit and Piggy Story – Hosted by Kermit and Miss Piggy as they reminisce over their moments on the show, with guest stars Raquel Welch, Tony Randall, Cheryl Ladd, and Loretta Swit
 Children's Songs and Stories with the Muppets – Hosted by Scooter as he looks through a scrapbook of children's songs from the show, with interruptions by others as he constantly tries to introduce his favourite song, "Six String Orchestra", with guest stars Julie Andrews, John Denver, Twiggy, Brooke Shields, Judy Collins, and Charles Aznavour
 Rock Music with the Muppets – Hosted by Dr. Teeth with assistance by Beaker in a recording studio, with guest stars Debbie Harry, Linda Ronstadt, Alice Cooper, Ben Vereen, Helen Reddy, Leo Sayer, Loretta Swit, and Paul Simon
 Muppet Treasures – Hosted by Kermit and Fozzie as they once again clean out the attic, with guest stars Zero Mostel, Loretta Lynn, Paul Simon, Buddy Rich, Peter Sellers, and Ethel Merman
 Gonzo Presents Muppet Weird Stuff – Hosted by Gonzo and Camilla at Gonzo's trailer home, which Gonzo tries to pass off as a mansion, with guest stars John Cleese, Jean Stapleton, Dom DeLuise, Julie Andrews, Vincent Price, and Madeline Kahn
 Country Music with the Muppets – Hosted by Rowlf at a barnyard radio station, with guest stars Mac Davis, John Denver, Crystal Gayle, Loretta Lynn, Roger Miller, Roy Clark, Johnny Cash, Roy Rogers, and Dale Evans
 Muppet Moments – Once again hosted by Kermit and Fozzie as they clean the attic, with guest stars Pearl Bailey, Bernadette Peters, Lena Horne, Andy Williams, Zero Mostel, and Liza Minnelli
 Rowlf's Rhapsodies with the Muppets – Hosted by Rowlf, with guest stars Marisa Berenson, Peter Sellers, George Burns, Petula Clark, and Steve Martin
 Fozzie's Muppet Scrapbook – Hosted by Fozzie in the attic as he looks through a scrapbook of his material from the show, with guest stars Raquel Welch, Beverly Sills, and Milton Berle

In 1993, Jim Henson Video released two compilations under the It's the Muppets banner, Meet the Muppets and More Muppets, Please! Later, three volumes of The Very Best of The Muppet Show were released on VHS and DVD in the UK (volume 3 was a release of full episodes as opposed to compilations). Unlike the Playhouse Video releases, It's the Muppets and The Very Best of The Muppet Show did not include any original footage or guest star clips, but all compilation collections did include material cut from the original US broadcasts.

Series releases
In 1994, Buena Vista Home Video under the Jim Henson Video imprint released The Muppet Show: Monster Laughs with Vincent Price, featuring the episodes with Vincent Price and Alice Cooper. Both episodes were edited. In addition to replacing the first series opening and the ending logos with Zoot, the Vincent Price episode was edited to remove the songs "I'm Looking Through You" and "You've Got a Friend" (the latter of which would be cut again when released on the first series DVD) as well as a sketch with the talking houses, while the Alice Cooper episode removed Robin's performance of "Somewhere Over the Rainbow".

Time-Life and Jim Henson Home Entertainment began marketing "best of" volumes of The Muppet Show for mail-order in 2001, with six initial volumes with three episodes on each VHS and DVD. Unique to each episode was an introduction by Jim Henson's son, Brian. Nine more volumes were added for 2002, the Muppets' 25th anniversary. The collection was available for retail in 2002 via Columbia TriStar Home Entertainment and Jim Henson Home Entertainment by which time Time-Life had released its tenth volume.

Buena Vista Home Entertainment released the three seasons on DVD in Region 1 in 2005 and 2008. The rights to the episodes and characters used in The Muppet Show, and subsequent film outings, were bought in February 2004 by The Walt Disney Company.

Several songs were cut from the series 1 DVD release due to music licensing issues. There have also been some cuts in the intro sequence, and backstage scenes leading up to these songs. However, episodes that used Disney music remained unaltered (for example, episode 14 of series 1 used "Never Smile at a Crocodile" from Peter Pan).

 "Stormy Weather" (Joel Grey episode) sung by Wayne and Wanda
 "Gone with the Wind" (Jim Nabors episode) sung by Jim Nabors
 "The Danceros" (Jim Nabors episode) sung by The Danceros
 "All of Me" (Paul Williams episode) sung by Two Monsters
 "Old Fashioned Way" (Charles Aznavour episode) sung by Charles Aznavour with Mildred Huxtetter
 "You've Got A Friend" (Vincent Price episode) sung by Vincent Price, Uncle Deadly and a chorus of Muppet Monsters

The only uncut release of Season 1 on DVD so far is the German DVD release by Buena Vista Home Entertainment Germany in 2010 (which also contains English audio). However, the intro and end credit sequences on this release are in German. In addition, the Paul Williams episode is missing a scene following "All of Me" wherein Fozzie and Scooter first discuss the "Old Telephone Pole bit". This scene does appear (albeit slightly abridged) in the international release. The German version also lacks the song "In My Life" performed by Twiggy, instead substituting it with a performance of "Lean on Me" by German singer Mary Roos.

Streaming 
The Muppet Show was released for streaming on Disney+ on 19 February 2021. However, two episodes featuring guests Brooke Shields and Chris Langham are omitted from the streaming service. In several European countries, the episode with John Denver is omitted as well. A content advisory was attached to several episodes describing "negative depictions and/or mistreatment of people or cultures".

See also
 Adult puppeteering

References

External links

 
 
 
 
 The Jim Henson Works at the University of Maryland. 70+ digital videos available to students, scholars and visitors at the University of Maryland (College Park, Maryland)

The Muppets television series
Television series by The Jim Henson Company
1970s American sketch comedy television series
1976 American television series debuts
1976 British television series debuts
1980s American sketch comedy television series
1981 American television series endings
1981 British television series endings
1970s American variety television series
1980s American variety television series
1970s British television sketch shows
British variety television shows
English-language television shows
First-run syndicated television programs in the United States
Peabody Award-winning television programs
Primetime Emmy Award for Outstanding Variety Series winners
Television shows produced by Associated Television (ATV)
American television shows featuring puppetry
Television series about show business
Television series about television
Television series by ITC Entertainment
Television series by ITV Studios
Television shows adapted into comics
Television shows shot at ATV Elstree Studios
Works set in theatres